The Very Best of Dexys Midnight Runners is a best of compilation album by English pop rock band Dexys Midnight Runners, released in 1991.

Content
The album contains seven Dexys singles that had also been album tracks ("Geno, "There, There My Dear", "The Celtic Soul Brothers", "Come On Eileen", "Jackie Wilson Said", "Old", and "This Is What She's Like") but was more notable as the first album to contain ten of Dexys' non-album singles, including "Let's Get This Straight (From the Start)", "Because of You", "Show Me", "One Way Love", "Breaking Down the Walls of Heartache", "Dance Stance", "Keep It Part Two (Inferiority Part One)", "I'm Just Looking", "Soon", and "Soul Finger"), plus the original recordings of two more ("Plan B", "Liars A to E").  "One Way Love" was the only Dexys song with Kevin Archer as the lead vocalist.  The tracks cover Dexys' entire career, shown by the fact that, although the album was released on Mercury Records, 9 of the album's 19 songs were recorded for EMI Records, Dexys' first label.

Commercial reception
The Very Best of Dexys Midnight Runners peaked at No. 12 in the UK Albums Chart and was certified Gold on 1 June 1991.

Track listing
 "Come On Eileen" (Kevin Rowland-"Big" Jim Paterson-Kevin "Billy" Adams) (from Too-Rye-Ay)
 "Jackie Wilson Said (I'm in Heaven When You Smile)" (Van Morrison) (from Too-Rye-Ay)
 "Let's Get This Straight (From the Start)" (Rowland-Adams-Helen O'Hara) (non-album single)
 "Because of You (The Theme from Brush Strokes)" (Rowland-Adams-O'Hara) (non-album single)
 "Show Me" (Rowland-Paterson) (non-album single)
 "Celtic Soul Brothers (More, Please, Thank You)" (Rowland-Paterson-Mickey Billingham) (from Too-Rye-Ay)
 "Liars A to E" (Rowland-Paterson-Steve Torch) (from Too-Rye-Ay)
 "One Way Love" (Bert Berns-Jerry Ragovoy) (B-side to "Keep It Part Two (Inferiority Part One)" single)*
 "Old" (Rowland-Paterson) (from Too-Rye-Ay)
 "Geno" (Rowland-Kevin Archer) (from Searching for the Young Soul Rebels)*
 "There, There, My Dear" (Rowland-Archer) (from Searching for the Young Soul Rebels)*
 "Breaking Down the Walls of Heartache" (Sandy Linzer-Denny Randell) (B-side to "Geno" single)*
 "Dance Stance" (Rowland) (non-album single)*
 "Plan B" (Rowland-Paterson) (non-album single)*
 "Keep It Part Two (Inferiority Part One)" (Rowland-Archer) (non-album single)*
 "I'm Just Looking" (Rowland-Geoff Blythe-Pete Saunders) (B-side to "Dance Stance" single)*
 "Soon" (Rowland-Paterson) (B-side to "Show Me" single)
 "This Is What She's Like" (Rowland-Adams-O'Hara) (from Don't Stand Me Down)
 "Soul Finger" (King/Jones/Alexander/Caldwell/Cunningham/Cauley) (B-Side to "Plan B" single)*

 - licensed from EMI

References

Dexys Midnight Runners albums
1991 greatest hits albums